Valley View High School is a public secondary school in Ontario, California. It is one of the eleven schools of the Chaffey Joint Union High School District. Valley View is one of two continuation schools in the district and enrolls more than 500 students. Valley View High School was named a Model Continuation High School in 2018 by California State Superintendent of Public Instruction, Tom Torlakson. The school colors are green and gold.

History
Valley View High School was opened in 1973. Starting the 2010–2011 school year, Canyon View High School merged with Valley View High School due to budget cuts.

Notes

External links
Valley View High School
Chaffey Joint Union High School District

References

High schools in San Bernardino County, California
Public high schools in California
1973 establishments in California